Chilostoma achates is a species of medium-sized, air-breathing, land snail, a terrestrial pulmonate gastropod mollusk in the family Helicidae, the true snails. IUCN has defined the snail as Near threatened, due to the development of tourism.

References

Chilostoma
Gastropods described in 1835